Fitness model can mean:
 Fitness model (person), a person who models, with emphasis on their physique
 Fitness model (network theory), a model of network evolution